Cora Beattie Anderson Roberton (4 March 1881–24 September 1962) was a decorated New Zealand nurse who ran several Allied hospitals in England during World War I. In time, she was appointed Matron to every major hospital for injured New Zealand soldiers in England.

At 21 she was one of the survivors of an Australian steamer disaster when it sank off the coast of New Zealand in 1902. After the collision, she was picked up by the last lifeboat to leave the sinking ship.

Life and work 
She was born Cora Beattie Anderson in Auckland as one of eight children of Annie Buchanan and City Engineer William Anderson and attended the local Girls Grammar School from 1895 to 1898.

On 9 November 1902, she was rescued on the last lifeboat to depart the passenger steamer Elingamite that sank 35 miles off the coast of New Zealand. She was rescued while standing in waist-deep water on the sinking steamer, and spent an estimated 25 hours, cramped and extremely cold in the open boat, before it found dry land. Of the 136 registered passengers on the steamer, fatalities from the collision numbered 28 passengers and 17 crew members, many of whom died from drowning or exposure to the elements. Her experience was detailed in the local papers.

Anderson went on to study nursing, graduating from the Thames Hospital in 1909 and finishing her midwife training at St Helen’s Hospital in Auckland. In 1910 she was appointed Matron of the Townley Maternity Home in Gisborne, and in 1912 she became a district nurse for Māori patients in the Rotorua district.

War service 
With the start of World War I in August 1914, Anderson was selected to serve among the first 50 nurses sent to England with the New Zealand Army Nursing Service (NZANS) under the direction of the British War Office. She was 34 years old when her group sailed for London on 8 April 1915. They soon left England to staff a hospital in Cairo, Egypt where they treated many hundreds of Allied soldiers wounded during the Gallipoli campaign in Turkey.

In June 1916, she was sent back to England and promoted to Matron so she could take charge of the No.1 New Zealand General Hospital at Brockenhurst. In December 1916, she was made Matron of the No. 3 New Zealand General Hospital No.3 at Codford on the Salisbury Plain, England, and then in April 1917, she became Matron of the Hornchurch Convalescent Hospital, in Essex, near London. That facility could handle up to 2,500 patients and treat 400 patients a day in its physiotherapy department. By 1918, about 20,000 patients had been treated at Hornchurch. Anderson was eventually appointed the Matron of each of the major New Zealand hospitals in England. 

In 1917, the Minister of Public Health recommended that Anderson receive specialized training to administer anesthetics, which at that time, was given to patients only by doctors and not by nurses. 

Due to her own failing health in 1919, Anderson was sent on leave to New Zealand and was discharged from her official duties even though she remained on the Service and Temporary Reserve of the NZANS until her retirement in 1921. In total, she served overseas for more than four years. After the war, Anderson became President of the Auckland Branch of the Returned Army Nursing Sisters Association for several terms.

Personal life 
On 1 October 1919, Cora married Eric Butterfield Roberton and changed her name to Cora Roberton. Eric Roberton, who had been a farmer at Tahora in Taranaki, New Zealand, before the war was wounded and sent to the New Zealand General Hospital at Brockenhurst in England in October 1917, while Cora Anderson was Matron there. 

In 1925, the Robertons had a daughter Elizabeth May and a son Craig and farmed in the Taranaki until 1948 when they moved to Auckland. Cora Roberton died there on 24 September 1962 at the age of 81. She is buried in Purewa Cemetery in Meadowbank, Auckland alongside her husband and daughter.

Distinctions and awards 
She was awarded the following decorations and medals for her service during World War I. The medals and badges are held at the Auckland War Memorial Museum.

 Royal Red Cross (1st Class) (RRC), 1919
 Associated Royal Red Cross (2nd Class) (ARRC), 1917
 1914–1915 Star Medal
 British War Medal 1914–1919
 Victory Medal, with oakleaf

References 

  

1881 births
1962 deaths
World War I nurses
People from Auckland
New Zealand nurses
New Zealand women nurses
20th-century New Zealand people